Kevin Ivory White (born September 27, 1993), known as Jumpman Blanco, is an American professional skateboarder, model, and actor.

Early life
Kevin White was born September 27, 1993, in Inglewood, California. White started skating when he was five years old. While growing up, White credits his late mother for being his biggest supporter.

Career
White was introduced by Na-Kel Smith to Mikey Alfred, founder of the skate crew and creative collective, Illegal Civilization. White was featured in the mini-series Summer of 17, starring Illegal Civilization members alongside cameos from rappers Tyler the Creator and Aminé.

In 2018 White and the Illegal Civilization team were featured as cast and crew members in Jonah Hill's feature film Mid90s and released a merchandise collection to promote the film with A24.

In 2020, White was featured on Thrasher Magazine cover The Heroes & Heavies Of Black Skateboarding, depicting all-time great black skaters both past and present. After his performance in the critically acclaimed Godspeed (2020) skate video, Illegal Civilization turned White pro giving him his first pro board. Davonte Jolly tapped White for the first part in Godspeed. White learned he'd have the opening part a couple days before the premiere.

Filmography

References

External links
 Personal Website
Kevin White Talks About Filming For Godspeed And Turning Pro For Illegal Civ - Nineclub

American skateboarders
1993 births
Living people